Francisca Antonia Méndez Zampogna (née Méndez Montero; born 5 May 1989 in Azua de Compostela) is a Dominican-American actress, TV host, and beauty pageant titleholder, who was crowned Nuestra Belleza Latina 2015 on 12 April 2015. She is currently a co-host on the popular morning show ¡Despierta América! on the Univision Network. She starred in Tu Cara Me Suena and after her two mega show/gala was eliminated due to Covid-19 exposure

Early life
Francisca was born on 5 May 1989. In her adolescence she participated and appeared in the Dominican television. She emigrated to the United States in 2010.

Nuestra Belleza Latina 2015
Francisca auditioned for Nuestra Belleza Latina in New York City where she advanced to Round 2 and was invited to Miami to further compete in the competition. After 12 weeks of competition, Francisca was crowned Nuestra Belleza Latina 2015, becoming the first Dominican to win the beauty Latino pageant. Francisca, Alejandra Espinoza, and Ana Patricia Gámez are currently the only winners of Nuestra Belleza Latina to never be in the Bottom 2 or 3. She won $200,000 in prizes, a Kia Soul, a one-year contract with Univision network and she was featured in People en Español magazine's 50 most beautiful people of 2015.

Career
As of April 2015, Francisca works as a reporter and co-host for Univision's morning show ¡Despierta América!. Francisca was also the host of the backstage segment called "Rincon Social" of Nuestra Belleza Latina 2016. She has also made appearances on El Gordo y la Flaca, Sabado Gigante, Sabadazo and Sal y Pimienta.

In October 2016, she traveled to Mexico City to film Televisa's telenovela Despertar contigo. In February 2017, she co-hosted the show Dale Replay for Univision alongside Carlos Calderon and Alessandra Villegas.
In 2018, she provided commentary for the Eurovision Song Contest 2018 with co-host Vanessa Claudio.

Personal life 
Francisca was married to Rochy Lachapel from 2010 to 2016. She married Italian businessman Francesco Zampogna in 2022 and lives in Miami, Florida. The couple welcomed their first child on July 7, 2021.

Notes

References

External links 
 
 

1989 births
Living people
People from Azua Province
Dominican Republic beauty pageant winners
Dominican Republic emigrants to the United States
Mixed-race Dominicans
Nuestra Belleza Latina winners